Giovanni "Tinto" Brass (born 26 March 1933) is an Italian film director and screenwriter. In the 1960s and 1970s, he directed many critically acclaimed avant-garde films of various genres. Today, he is mainly known for his later work in the erotic genre, with films such as Caligula, Così fan tutte (released under the English title All Ladies Do It), Paprika, Monella (Frivolous Lola) and Trasgredire.

Career

Avant-garde cinema
In the 1960s and 1970s, Brass was considered a promising experimental and avant-garde director, and his debut film Who Works Is Lost got very favorable reviews after screening at Venice Film Festival 1963. In 1964, he was commissioned by Umberto Eco to create two short films experimenting with visual language for the 13th Triennale di Milano – Tempo Libero and Tempo Lavorativo. Throughout the 1960s and early 1970s, Brass directed films in many genres, including western (Yankee) and crime (Col cuore in gola), all using a very experimental editing- and camera-style. In 1968, Warner Bros. offered Brass the job of directing A Clockwork Orange, which did not happen due to scheduling conflicts. In an article about the filming of Dropout from 1970, he was called the "Antonioni of the 70s". His early period has been referred to as ", anarchistic and experimental".

L'urlo was shown in competition at Berlin Film Festival 1970. La Vacanza, starring Vanessa Redgrave and Franco Nero won the prize of the film critics for the best Italian film at 1971 Venice Film Festival. In 1972, Brass was a member of the jury at the 22nd Berlin International Film Festival.

Erotic cinema
After Salon Kitty (1976) and Caligula (1979), the style of his films gradually changed towards erotic films. Caligula was originally supposed to be a satire on power instead of an erotic film, but the producers changed and re-edited the film entirely without Brass's consent, removing many political and comical scenes, and shooting sexually explicit sequences, to make the film a pornographic drama. The director demanded that his name be stricken from the credits, and he is only credited for "Principal Photography". Despite this, the film remains his most widely viewed work (and the highest-grossing Italian film released in the United States). Other notable works of Brass's later period include The Key (1983) and Senso '45 (2002). He was making films into his seventies.

Style

Brass' films since his early works follow an impressionistic style – they tend not to show immense landscapes, but bits and pieces of the scenery and peripheral characters and objects through pans and zooms, thus imitating how the viewer might see the events if he were actually present. This also gives the films an extraordinarily rapid pace. He often uses a television-like multicam method of shooting, with at least three cameras running at once, each focusing on something different.

There are many other directorial trademarks throughout his films. From Salon Kitty onwards, mirrors play a large part in the set design. Sometimes he even goes as far as to begin a scene with a mirror shot, then pan over to the action being reflected, giving a disorienting feeling. His erotic films – especially The Key, Miranda and All Ladies Do It – often accentuate women's ample buttocks and pubic hair as well as underarm hair.

Brass' films in the 1980s and early 1990s had mainly been adaptations of famous literary works usually in the erotic genre, namely The Key (La chiave), The Mistress of the Inn (Miranda), the novel Le lettere da Capri by Mario Soldati (Capriccio), the novel Snack Bar Budapest by Marco Lodoli and Silvia Bre (eponymous), Fanny Hill (Paprika), and the novel L'uomo che guarda by Alberto Moravia (The Voyeur), while 2002 film Senso '45 is an adaptation of Senso, previously filmed by Luchino Visconti.

Many of Brass' works qualify as period drama set during World War II (Salon Kitty and Senso '45, set in Berlin and Asolo respectively), in postbellum Italy (Miranda and Capriccio), antebellum Italy (The Key), and in 1950s Italy (Paprika and Monella).

Brass almost always works in a cameo for his friend Osiride Pevarello and himself as well. He was also featured as the presenter in the direct-to-video erotic short films compilation Tinto Brass presenta Corti Circuiti Erotici released in four volumes in 1999.

Personal life

Brass' nickname Tintoretto (later shortened to Tinto) was given by his grandfather Italico Brass, a renowned Gorizian painter.

He was married to Carla Cipriani (b. 1930, nicknamed "Tinta"), from 1957 until her death in 2006. Carla was the daughter of Harry's Bar founder Giuseppe Cipriani, who managed the restaurant Locanda Cipriani on the Venetian island of Torcello and also collaborated as a screenwriter in Brass's films. The couple had a daughter, Beatrice, and a son, Bonifacio.

After his wife's death, Brass began a relationship with lawyer Caterina Varzi (b. 1961) who starred in his 2009 short film Hotel Courbet. They married in 2017. 

Brass is politically affiliated with the Italian Radicals.

On 18 April 2010, he suffered an intracranial hemorrhage.

Retrospectives
In 2012, Hollywood Reel Independent Film Festival did a retrospective on Brass' early 1960s and 1970s films, screening newly restored versions. The restorations were done in collaboration with Alexander Tuschinski, who in recent years researched Brass' 1960s/1970s works and has been called "the foremost scholastic authority on Tinto Brass".

Filmography

Filmography as actor 
 Ultimo metrò, dir. Andrea Prandstraller (1999)
 Impotenti esistenziali, dir. Giuseppe Cirillo (2009)

References

External links 

 .
 .

 .
 .

1933 births
Living people
Film people from Milan
Italian film directors
Italian pornographic film directors
Italian film editors
Italian people of Austrian descent
Italian libertarians